Podgorje is a settlement in the City Municipality of Slovenj Gradec in northern Slovenia. The area is part of the traditional region of Styria. The entire municipality is now included in the Carinthia Statistical Region.

The parish church in the settlement is dedicated to Saint Ulrich and belongs to the Roman Catholic Archdiocese of Maribor. It dates to the late 15th century.  A second church built on a hill west of the settlement is dedicated to the Holy Spirit and was built in 1459.

References

External links
Podgorje at Geopedia

Populated places in the City Municipality of Slovenj Gradec
Slovenj Gradec